Glenn Hoag is a Canadian professional volleyball coach and former player. The current head coach of Arkas İzmir.

Player
Hoag played for the Université de Sherbrooke in his university years, before turning pro and playing overseas in Italy and France.

Coaching
Hoag began his coaching career in 1993 with the University of Sherbrooke. While still at the helm in Sherbrooke, he also began coaching in France, at Paris Volley. His highlight during his tenure in Paris was in 2001 when he coached the team to a Triple Crown victory, winning the French Cup, the French Championship and the European Champions Cup.

In 2006, he was employed as the head coach of the Canada men's national volleyball team. Hoag led the team to a 7th-place finish in both, the World Cup and the World Championships, a bronze medal in the 2015 Pan American Games, Canada's first ever NORCECA Championship title, and a berth in the 2016 Summer Olympics.

In 2018, Hoag came back to coaching the Canadian national volleyball team.

Personal life
Hoag's sons, Nick and Christopher, are both professional volleyball players.

Honours

Clubs
 CEV Champions League
  2000/2001 – with Paris Volley
 CEV Cup
  1999/2000 – with Paris Volley
 CEV Challenge Cup
  2010/2011 – with Arkas İzmir
 National championships
 1999/2000  French Cup, with Paris Volley
 1999/2000  French Championship, with Paris Volley
 2000/2001  French Cup, with Paris Volley
 2000/2001  French Championship, with Paris Volley
 2001/2002  French Championship, with Paris Volley
 2002/2003  French Championship, with Paris Volley
 2008/2009  Slovenian Cup, with ACH Volley
 2008/2009  Slovenian Championship, with ACH Volley
 2009/2010  Slovenian Cup, with ACH Volley
 2009/2010  Slovenian Championship, with ACH Volley
 2010/2011  Turkish Cup, with Arkas İzmir
 2012/2013  Turkish Championship, with Arkas İzmir
 2014/2015  Turkish Championship, with Arkas İzmir
 2021/2022  Turkish Cup, with Arkas İzmir

References

External links

 
 Player profile at LegaVolley.it 
 Coach/Player Profile at Volleybox.net

1958 births
Living people
People from La Tuque, Quebec
Sportspeople from Sherbrooke
Canadian men's volleyball players
Canadian volleyball coaches
Olympic volleyball players of Canada
Volleyball players at the 1984 Summer Olympics
Canadian expatriate sportspeople in France
Canadian expatriate sportspeople in Slovenia
Canadian expatriate sportspeople in Turkey